Gil González Dávila (1570–1658) was a Spanish archivist, courtier and chronicler.

Life
He was born and died at Ávila. He spent his early years in Rome, where he was educated at the residence of Cardinal Deza.  He returned to Spain when he was 20 and settled in Salamanca.  He was called to Madrid and made historiographer to the Crown of Castile in 1612, and for the Indies in 1641. Of his numerous works, the most valuable are his Teatro de las Grandezas des Madrid (Madrid, 1623, sqq.), and his Teatro Eclesiastico, descriptive of the metropolitan churches and cathedrals of Castile, with lives of the prelates (Madrid, 1645–1653, 4 vols.)

Notes

References

Attribution

1559 births
1658 deaths
Spanish biographers
Spanish male writers
Male biographers
17th-century Spanish historians